Costache Ioanid (3 December 1912 - 26 November 1987) was a Romanian poet and songwriter (composer) of Romanian poems and songs. He wrote many songs that are used all over Romania today, and is one of the best known Christian composers in Romania.

Biography
December 3, 1912, Ioanid Costache is born, the fourth son of Titus and Ecaterina at Comandaresti in North Bukovina.

1923-Starts to study at the "Liceul Internat" highschool in Iasi.

1929-1934. He studied at the Academy of Dramatic Arts and graduated with the maximum grade. Opens the first exhibition of sculpture caricature. Works in clay, painted in oil colors in glass, wax, paper, wood.

Between 1934-1952 opens seven such exhibitions in Iasi and then in Bucharest.

1938 moved to the capital (Bucharest). Perform "nonpolitical Ballet", famous in that times. At one of the representatives participated King Charles II himself.

1939 - Married Elena Stefanescu in Iasi.

1940- While reading the Bible on a bench in the park, is noted by Mihai and Sabina Wurmbrand which invites him to the Lutheran Church pastored by Richard Wurmbrand.

Start-depth study of Bible and wrote his first Christian poems.

1941-1944. He is hired as Cartographer at the General Staff.

1958-1961. They live from painting. Attend the Pentecostal Church from Calea Mosilor. His writings circulated throughout the country illegally. He refused to write in the style of communist propaganda.

1961-1966. He works as a technical illustrator at IPROMET.

1963-was under arrest at Malmaison. He is investigated throughout the year.

1966- attend the Lutheran church. It is recognized as one of the leading Christian poets together with Traian Dorz and others.

1981-death of his wife, Elena.

1981, immigrating to the U.S. The first volume of poetry Taine (Mysteries) is published.

November 26, 1987, Thanksgiving Day, he died.

References
http://www.resursecrestine.ro/biografii/66065/costache-ioanid - biography

External links
 http://www.resursecrestine.ro/poezii/index-autori/costache-ioanid
 http://www.romanianvoice.com/poezii/poeti/ioanid.php - poems

1912 births
1987 deaths
People from the Duchy of Bukovina
Christian writers
Christian poets
Romanian songwriters
Romanian male poets
Romanian cartographers
20th-century Romanian poets
20th-century male writers
20th-century cartographers